In human embryonic development a pre-embryo is a conceptus before implantation in the uterus.

Pre-embryo in human embryonic development

The word pre-embryo sometimes is used in ethical contexts to refer to a human conceptus at least between fertilization and implantation, though this term has not been adopted by the scientific community. A conceptus between fertilization and implantation is also frequently classified as a pre-implantation embryo.

Even after implantation begins, a pre-embryo may exist up until formation of the primitive streak.  Implantation begins at about six days after fertilization, and lasts for about a week, during which time formation of the primitive streak occurs.

Use of the term pre-embryo, in the context of human development, has drawn criticism from opponents of embryo research, and from scientists who have considered this categorization invalid or unnecessary.  One rationale that has been advanced for distinguishing an early fertilized human conceptus from an embryo is that there is a potential for the conceptus to split into identical twins prior to implantation, and so (the argument goes) the conceptus cannot be regarded before implantation as a single human being.  However, the conceptus before implantation exhibits self-actuated activity, which has led to the assertion that it is an embryo. Further, identical twinning is an instance of asexual reproduction whereby a conceptus, without ceasing to be what it is (a new human being), provides a cell or cells as a new conceptus, entirely separated or partially separated (a 'siamese' twin) from the original conceptus, but in any event self-actuated in its development from the moment that the act of asexual reproduction (twinning) is complete. By this asexual reproduction, the parents of the original conceptus in effect become grandparents to the identical twin so conceived.

In the United States, a report by the National Institutes of Health stated that a conceptus could be both a pre-implantation embryo and a pre-embryo at the same time.  However, Ann Kiessling (a leader in stem cell research) has written that those categories are inaccurate.

Ontological status
The illustration shows the ontological status of the preembryo, embryo, and fetus:

(o) indicates the (natural &) standard reproductive and embryogenic pathway
(mz) indicates all the possible pathways for a monozygotic twin 
(/c) indicates a clone created by either SCNT or ANT 
(ch) indicates all the possible pathways for a chimeric individual 
(dz) indicates the pathway of a dizygotic twin
(en) indicates an enucleated oocyte
(m) indicates a hydatidiform mole
(cm) indicates a complete hydatidiform mole
(pm) indicates a partial hydatidiform mole, and 
(p) indicates parthenogenesis.

(O) indicates an oocyte, 
(Z) indicates a zygote, 
(M) indicates a morula, 
(B) indicates a blastocyst, 
(E) indicates an embryo, 
(F) indicates a fetus, 
(I) indicates a live born individual person.  
(PM) indicates a partial hydatidiform mole, 
(CM) indicates a complete hydatidiform mole, 
(T) indicates a teratoma.

The colors represent the maternal and paternal genetic contributions.

See also
 Beginning of pregnancy controversy
 In vitro fertilization
 Pregnancy
 Stem cell controversy

Footnotes

Embryology